West Huajing is a metro station on the Line 15 of the Shanghai Metro. Located along an unbuilt section of Jinghong Road near its intersection with an unbuilt section of Huaji Road and straddling the boundary between Minhang and Xuhui districts in the city of Shanghai, the station was scheduled to open with the rest of Line 15 in 2020. However, the station eventually opened on 23 January 2021 following a one-month postponement.
Half-Trains terminated here and trains would have to switch tracks to return to northbound track towards Gucun Park, until the south terminal station of short-route trains was extended to Shuangbai Road station.

References 

Railway stations in Shanghai
Shanghai Metro stations in Minhang District
Shanghai Metro stations in Xuhui District
Line 15, Shanghai Metro
Railway stations in China opened in 2021